Androstanediol may refer to:

 3α-Androstanediol (5α-androstane-3α,17β-diol) – an endogenous neurosteroid, weak androgen and estrogen, and intermediate to androsterone
 3β-Androstanediol (5α-androstane-3β,17β-diol) – an endogenous estrogen and intermediate to epiandrosterone
 3α-Etiocholanediol (5β-androstane-3α,17β-diol; etiocholane-3α,17β-diol) – an endogenous intermediate to etiocholanolone
 3β-Etiocholanediol (5β-androstane-3β,17β-diol; etiocholane-3β,17β-diol) – an endogenous intermediate to epietiocholanolone

See also 
 Etiocholanediol
 Androstenediol
 Androstanedione
 Androstenedione
 Androstanolone
 Androstenolone

Androstanes